Lima is a genus of file shells or file clams, marine bivalve molluscs in the family Limidae, the file shells, within the subclass Pteriomorphia. 

The shells are obliquely trigonal, and strongly radially ribbed, the ribs scabrous to spinose.

The soft parts are bright red and many tentacles protrude from the open valves.

Species
 Lima attenuata (Dall, 1916)
 † Lima becki C. A. Fleming, 1955 
 Lima benthonimbifer Iredale, 1925
 Lima bullifera Deshayes in Maillard, 1863
 Lima caribaea d'Orbigny, 1853
 † Lima carolina d'Orbigny, 1850 
 † Lima colorata Hutton, 1873 
 Lima disalvoi Raines, 2002
 Lima fujitai Oyama, 1943
 Lima hyperborea Jensen, 1909
 Lima kimthachi Thach, 2016
 Lima lima (Linnaeus, 1758) - spiny fileclam
 Lima marioni P. Fischer, 1882
 Lima messura (Kilburn, 1998)
 Lima nakayasui Habe, 1987
 Lima nasca (F. R. Bernard, 1988)
 Lima nimbifer Iredale, 1924
 Lima ogasawaraensis Habe, 1993
 † Lima paleata Hutton, 1873 
 Lima paucicostata G. B. Sowerby II, 1843
 Lima quantoensis Yokoyama, 1920
 † Lima robini C. A. Fleming, 1950 
 Lima sagamiensis Masahito, Kuroda & Habe in Kuroda, 1971
 Lima sabauriculata (Montagu, 1808)
 Lima spectata (Iredale, 1929)
 Lima tahitensis E. A. Smith, 1885
 Lima tetrica Gould, 1851
 Lima tomlini Prashad, 1932
 Lima tropicalis (Iredale, 1939)
 † Lima vasis Marwick, 1928 
 Lima vulgaris (Link, 1807)
 Lima vulgatula Yokoyama, 1922
 † Lima waipipiensis P. Marshall & Murdoch, 1919 
 † Lima watersi Marwick, 1926
 Lima zealandica G. B. Sowerby III, 1877
  Lima zushiensis Yokoyama, 1920
Synonyms
 Lima colorata zealandica sowerby, 1876: synonym of Lima zealandica G. B. Sowerby III, 1877
 Lima excavata (Fabricius, 1779) - excavated fileclam: synonym of Acesta excavata (Fabricius, 1779)
 Lima floridana Olsson and Harbison, 1953 - smooth fileclam: synonym of Ctenoides mitis (Lamarck, 1807)
 Lima hians (Gmelin, 1791): synonym of Limaria hians (Gmelin, 1791)
 Lima locklini McGinty, 1955 - locklin fileclam, skewed fileclam: synonym of Limaria locklini (McGinty, 1955)
 Lima pellucida C. B. Adams, 1846 - Antillean fileclam: synonym of Limaria pellucida (C. B. Adams, 1848)
 Lima scabra (Born, 1778) - rough file clam: synonym of Ctenoides scaber (Born, 1778)
 Lima squamosa Lamarck, 1819): synonym of Lima lima (Linnaeus, 1758)
 Lima subovata (Jeffreys, 1879) - subovate fileclam: synonym of Limatula subovata (Monterosato, 1875)
 Lima tenera G.B. Sowerby II, 1843: synonym of Ctenoides mitis (Lamarck, 1807)

References

 
 Powell A. W. B., New Zealand Mollusca, William Collins Publishers Ltd, Auckland, New Zealand 1979 

Limidae
Extant Jurassic first appearances
Bivalve genera